The 1934 San Francisco State Golden Gaters football team represented San Francisco State Teachers College—now known as San Francisco State University—as an independent during the 1934 college football season. Led by Dave Cox his fourth and final season as head coach, San Francisco State compiled a record of 3–3–1 and was outscored by its opponents 82 to 49. The Golden Gaters were shut out in four games. The team played home games at Ewing Field in San Francisco. Although the "Gator" was voted to be the mascot for the team in 1931, local newspaper articles called the team the "Golden Gaters".

Schedule

Notes

References

San Francisco State
San Francisco State Gators football seasons
San Francisco State Golden Gaters football